Terror of the Autons is the first serial of the eighth season of the British science fiction television series Doctor Who. It was broadcast in four weekly parts on BBC1 from 2 to 23 January 1971.

The serial is set in various locations in England. In the serial, the alien time traveller the Third Doctor (Jon Pertwee) and the organisation UNIT work to stop the Master (Roger Delgado), a renegade Time Lord, from using a radio telescope to summon an invasion force of the incorporeal intelligence the Nestenes to Earth.

The serial introduced three new characters: the Doctor's new companion, Jo Grant (played by Katy Manning); his archenemy the Master; and Captain Mike Yates (Richard Franklin).

Plot

The Master arrives on Earth and steals the sole surviving Nestene energy unit from the National Space Museum. He then hijacks the Beacon Hill radio telescope, which he uses as a bridgehead to channel energy into the Nestene unit, and kidnaps Professor Philips, a Ministry of Technology research scientist. Reports of the theft and sabotage bring the Doctor, his new assistant Jo Grant and Brigadier Lethbridge-Stewart to investigate. At Beacon Hill the Doctor encounters a fellow Time Lord, who warns him that an "old acquaintance" is on Earth and will certainly try to kill him. The Doctor then identifies and successfully neutralises the boobytrap, which the Master has left behind.

The Master takes over Farrel Autoplastics, a nearby plastics factory, to build Autons. Jo, investigating the factory, is discovered by the Master, who hypnotises her and wipes her memory of their meeting. He sends her back to UNIT with a booby-trap, a box ostensibly containing the stolen energy unit. The Doctor realises she has been hypnotised and disposes of the bomb.

UNIT traces the missing Professor Philips to Rossini's Circus at Tarminster. The Doctor visits the Circus, and is captured by Rossini, but freed by Jo, who has followed him there against orders. The Doctor removes something from the Master's TARDIS but is attacked by Rossini and his men. Rescued by two policemen, the Doctor becomes suspicious and unmasks one of them as an Auton.

Fleeing from the Autons, the Doctor and Jo hide in a quarry until the Brigadier and Captain Mike Yates arrive. A firefight breaks out between the soldiers and the Autons, enabling the Doctor's party to escape. Meanwhile, a larger group of Autons, disguised in weird Carnival masks, are touring the country handing out free plastic daffodils to the public. Soon deaths from asphyxiation, shock, and heart failure are being reported all across the country.

The Master infiltrates UNIT headquarters disguised as a telephone engineer, and installs an extra-long telephone flex in the Doctor's laboratory. At the now-empty plastics factory, the Brigadier and the Doctor discover that Farrel, the owner, has chartered a coach. They also find a plastic daffodil, and a lurking killer Auton, proving the connection between the factory and the Master.

In the Doctor's lab, as he tries to decode the Nestenes' instructions imprinted on the cells of the plastic flower, a radio signal from a walkie-talkie accidentally activates it. The daffodil sprays a plastic film over Jo's nose and mouth, nearly suffocating her, until the Doctor dissolves it with a chemical solvent. The Master makes another attempt to kill the Doctor, by calling him on the telephone he installed earlier, and using a sonic signalling device to activate the plastic telephone cable. The extra-length cable attempts to strangle the Doctor, but thanks to the Brigadier's quick thinking, fails.

The Master then breaks into UNIT HQ. As a bargaining counter, the Doctor reveals that he has possession of the Master's dematerialisation circuit, and threatens to destroy it: but he is foiled by the presence of Jo, who the Master takes as a hostage. The Master takes both Jo and the Doctor to the quarry near the radio telescope, to force the Brigadier to abort a planned RAF airstrike on the Autons sheltering there. But Farrel, struggling to break free of his hypnosis, unexpectedly causes a diversion, and while the Master is busy subduing him the Doctor and Jo escape.

UNIT troops engage the Autons, while the Doctor and the Brigadier pursue the Master into the radio telescope's control cabin. The Doctor convinces the Master that the Nestenes are so utterly different they will not be able to distinguish between him and the humans once they arrive. Together, they use the channel opened for the invasion to force the Nestene energy back into space, causing the Autons to collapse. The Master flees, returning to the coach only to re-emerge, apparently surrendering. When he pulls out a gun, Yates shoots him dead, but the Doctor peels back a facemask on the body to reveal it is the hypnotised Farrel, disguised to look like the Master. The real Master escapes in the coach. However, with his dematerialisation circuit in the Doctor's hands, the Master is now trapped on Earth.

Production
Working titles for this story included The Spray of Death. The Autons were brought back because they had been popular in their first appearance the previous year in Spearhead from Space (1970).

For the new season, producer Barry Letts and script editor Terrance Dicks wanted to add new characters. They thought about how the Brigadier was like Dr. Watson to the Doctor's Sherlock Holmes, and decided to devise a new character, the Master, to emulate Moriarty. The Master was meant to specifically contrast with Pertwee's Doctor; the Doctor was authoritative while the Master was charming, though he used that for an evil purpose. Terror of the Autons also introduced Katy Manning as Jo Grant (as a replacement for departed companion Liz Shaw), and Richard Franklin as Captain Mike Yates.

The scene at the start of Episode Three, where an Auton is hit by a car and tumbles off a cliff, was quite real. Dinny Powell was driving the vehicle in place of actor Richard Franklin, and stuntman Terry Walsh, playing the Auton, fell further down the slope than intended, being injured in the mishap. He nevertheless got back to his feet in the same take, as planned. Letts requested that a sequence near the story's ending, in which Yates yells to the Doctor, "We've got him now!", be reshot because Franklin's performance was too over-the-top. Franklin was grateful for this.

On the first day of filming, Katy Manning injured all the ligaments in her foot when jumping out of a car and running across a quarry. She also formed a fast bond with Barry Letts, as she was fond of the animals used in the serial. Nicholas Courtney was also ill on the first day, so was replaced by a double in those quarry scenes.

Cast notes
Harry Towb, who plays McDermott, had previously appeared in The Seeds of Death (1969).

Michael Wisher, the young Rex Farrel, had also done uncredited voice work on Seeds, and had previously appeared in The Ambassadors of Death (as the TV News anchorman) and, later, Carnival of Monsters (as the machiavellian politician Kalik). He went on to do various Dalek voices (in Planet of the Daleks and Death to the Daleks), and became well known as the first actor to play the evil genius Davros in Genesis of the Daleks. His final appearance was as a member of the crew of the Morestran Probe in Planet of Evil.

Roy Stewart previously appeared as Toberman in The Tomb of the Cybermen (1967).

Andrew Staines who plays Goodge was a sergeant in The Enemy of the World (1968).

Christopher Burgess who plays Professor Philips was also in The Enemy of the World (1968) playing the role of Swann.

Broadcast and reception

Certain scenes in the serial, particularly the killer doll and the Auton policemen, caused controversy in the press as being too frightening for children. In an unconnected House of Lords debate about the effect of mass media on the public, the serial was cited as an example of a programme that might be too 'scary' for younger children.

Jon Pertwee would later state that he thought the story "was excellent. One of the best we ever did." Paul Cornell, Martin Day, and Keith Topping simply wrote of the serial in The Discontinuity Guide (1995), "Functional and memorably scary, but by no means an Auton story." In The Television Companion (1998), David J. Howe and Stephen James Walker called it a "strong start" to the season, though they commented that the story was not as effective as Spearhead from Space in "depicting the threat of the Autons." They praised the introduction of the Master, calling him "the most interesting character to have been introduced to the series since the Doctor himself", though they found it improbable that one comment from the Doctor would persuade him to change his plan. Howe and Walker also praised Letts' direction, though they found that the over-use of CSO caused some scenes to "look false and strained". In 2009, Patrick Mulkern of Radio Times compared the serial to a comic strip and wrote positively about Manning and Delgado. However, he noted that there were "plot holes" and "gaudy early '70s production values". Ian Berriman of SFX, reviewing the serial for its 2011 DVD release, also commented that Delgado was "note-perfect from the off" and that while the climax was "feeble", he felt "it's all such outrageous fun that it doesn't really matter". DVD Talk reviewer John Sinnott described Terror of the Autons as "a wonderful romp," although "the ending is rushed and pretty much just pulled out of nowhere". Sinnott particularly praised the Doctor and the Master, as well as the "subtle humor". Den of Geek's James Peatly wrote that Terror of the Autons was "a fantastically entertaining and incredibly confident slice of macabre fun". He was positive toward the family tone, Jo, and the Master but felt that it "lacks some of the narrative cohesion" of Spearhead from Space and "the Autons are reduced to playing the role of foot soldiers to the Master". In 2009, SFX named the cliffhanger to Episode Two, in which the policeman is revealed to be an Auton, as the 20th scariest moment in Doctor Who.

Commercial releases

In print

A novelisation of this serial, written by Terrance Dicks, was published by Target Books in May 1975.  The cover art by Achilleos depicts what is supposed to be a fully developed Nestene, though this was never actually seen in the serial itself. The novelisation was reissued in 1979 with a new cover by Alan Hood.

The novelisation introduces Jo Grant, although Malcolm Hulke's Colony in Space novelisation (titled Doctor Who and The Doomsday Weapon) had already done so – albeit in contradiction to the television programme. The Master and the Doctor are revealed herein (borrowing from The Making of Doctor Who by Malcolm Hulke and Terrance Dicks, published in 1972) to have names that are mathematical formulae, and the grenade the Master uses is identified (again, contrary to the television programme) as Sontaran.

An unabridged reading of the novelisation by actor Geoffrey Beevers was released on CD on 7 July 2010 by BBC Audiobooks.

Home media
Although the BBC wiped the serial's original 625-line videotapes for reuse, they kept 16mm b/w telerecording film prints. In 1993, these prints were combined with the colour signal from an off-air 525-line NTSC domestic videotape recording, resulting in relatively high-quality colour masters for a VHS release. A short clip from Episode One, depicting the Doctor's first meeting with Jo Grant, still survives in its original 625-line format, on a clip reel prepared for a 1973 edition of the news show Nationwide. The short Nationwide clip is presented on the DVD of The Aztecs, in a featurette discussing the VidFIRE restoration process.

As of 5 August 2008, this serial has been included for sale on iTunes. It was released on DVD in 2011 in a boxset entitled Mannequin Mania with the special edition of Spearhead from Space. The Nationwide clip is incorporated into Episode one; the rest of the serial consists of restored footage. Comparison between the remastered episodes and clips included in the behind-the-scenes material demonstrate that a great deal of restoration work has been carried out on the picture and sound quality.

The story was released on DVD again in 2013, included in a set paired with "The End of Time" (a two-part Tenth Doctor David Tennant story from 2009/10), in "The Monster Collection" series, specifically "The Master" entry.

This story, along with the rest of Season 8 was released on Blu-ray on 23 February 2021, to coincide with the 50th Anniversary of The Master. It features a new 5.1 sound mix, optional updated special effects, CSO clean up and a brand new restoration of the film prints.

References

Notes

External links

Target novelisation

Third Doctor serials
Doctor Who serials novelised by Terrance Dicks
Fiction set in the 1980s
The Master (Doctor Who) television stories
1971 British television episodes